Blochius longirostris is a species of prehistoric fish belonging to the family Blochiidae. This fish lived in the middle Eocene (about 50 million years ago) and its fossils have been found exclusively in the well-known Monte Bolca (Italy).

Description
Blochius longirostris was similar to a swordfish.

Bibliography
 G. S. Volta, Ittiolitologia Veronese del museo Bozziano ora annesso a quello del conte Giovambattista Gazola e di altri gabinetti fossili veronesi con la versione latina, Stamperia Guiliari, Verona, 1796–1808, 323 pp.
 C. R. Eastman,  Catalog of fishes in the Carnegie Museum. Part 1. Fishes from the Upper Eocene of monte Bolca. Mem. Carnegie Mus., Pittsburgh 4, 1911. pp. 349–391.
  W. Landini e L. Sorbini. 1996. Ecological and trophic relationships of Eocene monte Bolca (Pesciara) fish fauna, pp 105–112 in A. Cherchi, ed. Autoecology of selected fossil organisms: achievements and problems. Boll. soc. Paleo. Italiana spec 3.
 H.L. Fierstine e K. A. Monsch. 2002. Redescription and phylogenetic relationships of the Family Blochiidae (Perciformes: Scombroidei), middle Eocene, monte Bolca, Italy. Miscellanea Paleontologica, studi e ricerche sui giacimenti terziari di Bolca, mus. civico storia nat. Verona 9: 121–163. 
 H.L. Fierstine,  2006. Fossil history of billfishes (Xiphioidei). Bull. Mar. Sci., 79(3): 433–453.

References
Blochius, Paleobiology Database
 Harry L. Fierstine: Fossil History of Billfishes (Xiphioidei). Bulletin of Marine Science, Volume 79, Issue 3, Januar 2006, Seiten 433-453 Abstract 
 Karl Albert Frickhinger: Fossilien Atlas Fische, Mergus-Verlag, Melle, 1999, 

Acanthomorpha
Eocene fish
Fossils of Italy